Aleksandr Mikhailovich Savin (born 20 October 1984) is a Russian former professional football player.

Club career
He made his Russian Football National League debut for FC Rotor Volgograd on 18 April 2010 in a game against FC Dynamo Saint Petersburg.

External links
 
 

1984 births
People from Borovichi
Living people
Russian footballers
FC Aktobe players
FC Zhenis Astana players
Russian expatriate footballers
Expatriate footballers in Kazakhstan
FC Rotor Volgograd players
Russian expatriate sportspeople in Kazakhstan
FC Tosno players
FC Dynamo Saint Petersburg players
Kazakhstan Premier League players
Expatriate footballers in Estonia
JK Sillamäe Kalev players
Meistriliiga players
Association football forwards
Sportspeople from Novgorod Oblast